William John Cartwright (11 June 1922 – June 1992) was an English footballer, who played as a wing half in the Football League for Tranmere Rovers.

References

External links

Tranmere Rovers F.C. players
1922 births
1992 deaths
Association football wing halves
English Football League players
English footballers